Aphrozestis is a genus of moths belonging to the subfamily Tortricinae of the family Tortricidae.

Species
Aphrozestis scoriopa Meyrick, 1931

See also
List of Tortricidae genera

References

External links
Tortricid.net

Tortricidae genera
Monotypic moth genera